ABC Theater is an American television anthology series that aired on ABC and featured quality dramatic presentations over a period of 12 years. Although some sources indicate the series began in 1974, ABC lists the first production in 1972, with irregular broadcasts until 1984.

Directors for the series of television movies included George Schaefer, Stanley Kramer, Joseph Papp, George Cukor, José Quintero, Daniel Petrie, Randal Kleiser and Delbert Mann.

Writers contributing original material for the series included James Costigan, Alice Childress, Lonne Elder III and Loring Mandel.

In 1973, ABC shared in a joint Peabody Award with NBC and CBS "for their outstanding contributions to entertainment through an exceptional year of televised drama."  The award particularly noted the ABC Theater productions of The Glass Menagerie and Pueblo.

Selected episodes

ABC Theater Award
In 1977, ABC Inc., established the “ABC Theater” Award. The award provided a grant to the National Playwrights Conference of the Eugene O'Neill Theater Center and a cash award of $10,000 to the winning playwright. The playwright's work was then telecast as an ABC Theater Presentation. Winners of the award have included George Rubino for The Last Tenant, Lee Hunkins for Hollow Image, Preston Ransone for King Crab, J. Rufus Caleb for Benny's Place and Phil Penningroth for Ghost Dancing.

References

American Broadcasting Company original programming
1970s American anthology television series
1980s American anthology television series